The 1992 Colonial Athletic Association men's basketball tournament was held March 7–9 at the Richmond Coliseum in Richmond, Virginia. 

In only their first year in the CAA, Old Dominion defeated  in the championship game, 78–73, to win their third CAA men's basketball tournament. The Monarchs, therefore, earned an automatic bid to the 1992 NCAA tournament.

Old Dominion rejoined the CAA from the Sun Belt Conference prior to the season, replacing Navy, who departed to join the Patriot League.

Bracket

References

Colonial Athletic Association men's basketball tournament
Tournament
CAA men's basketball tournament
CAA men's basketball tournament
Sports competitions in Virginia
Basketball in Virginia